Blagovest Georgiev Kisyov (born 14 April 1986) is a Bulgarian badminton player.

Career 
Kisyov started playing badminton at the age of 10 in his home town of Parvomay. By 15, he moved to a club in a bigger city nearby in order to have better training conditions. He joined the junior national team at that time and started representing Bulgaria on various events. In 2005, he moved to Sofia and entered the National Sports Academy. In 2006, he started working as an assistant coach in the BWF Sofia training centre simultaneously while training with the national team players, and in the same year he won Bulgarian National Badminton Championships in men's doubles event. Unfortunately in 2009 he got injured in his back and had to quit playing for 1.5 years. He resumed training and competing in October 2010. He attended different training programmes and camps in Malaysia, Indonesia and Europe which has helped him obtain better knowledge and improve his game. In 2012, he won Bulgarian National Badminton Championships in men's doubles event, and became the runner-up of Bulgaria Hebar Open tournament in mixed doubles event. In 2014, he became the runner-up at Hellas International in mixed doubles event and Hatzor International tournaments in men's singles event.
In 2015, he participated at the 2015 European Games in men's singles event. He reached singles round of 16 after defeated by Scott Evans of Ireland in straight games 6-21, 13-21.

Achievements

BWF International Challenge/Series 
Men's singles

Men's doubles

Mixed doubles

  BWF International Challenge tournament
  BWF International Series tournament
  BWF Future Series tournament

References

External links 
 
 

1986 births
Living people
People from Parvomay
Bulgarian male badminton players
Badminton players at the 2015 European Games
European Games competitors for Bulgaria
21st-century Bulgarian people